Altenzaun is a village and a former municipality in the district of Stendal, in Saxony-Anhalt, Germany. Since 1 January 2009, it is part of the municipality Hohenberg-Krusemark.

Former municipalities in Saxony-Anhalt
Stendal (district)